Pekka Pietilä (born 1 January 1945) is a Finnish rower. He competed in the men's coxless four event at the 1976 Summer Olympics.

References

1945 births
Living people
Finnish male rowers
Olympic rowers of Finland
Rowers at the 1976 Summer Olympics
Place of birth missing (living people)